Miào is a Chinese surname.

Notable people
 Cora Miao (繆騫人) is a Chinese actress 
 Miao Boying (Chinese: 缪伯英) Chinese teacher, writer and revolutionary who became the first woman to join the Communist Party
 Miao Ruilin (缪瑞林; born 1964) is a former Chinese politician, best known for his term as Mayor of Nanjing
 Miao Fu (繆輔) Chinese imperial painter during the Xuande era
 Miao Xiaochun (Chinese: 缪晓春; born 1964, Wuxi, Jiangsu, China) artist and photographer based in Beijing
 Guowang Miao associate professor at KTH Royal Institute of Technology, Sweden

Individual Chinese surnames